(Be still, stop chattering), BWV 211, also known as the Coffee Cantata, is a secular cantata by Johann Sebastian Bach. He composed it probably between 1732 and 1735. Although classified as a cantata, it is essentially a miniature comic opera. In a satirical commentary, the cantata amusingly tells of an addiction to (or rather dependence on) coffee.

History and text 

Bach regularly directed a musical ensemble based at Zimmermann's coffee house called a collegium musicum, founded by Georg Philipp Telemann in 1702. The libretto suggests that some people in eighteenth-century Germany viewed coffee drinking as a bad habit. However, the work is likely to have been first performed at the coffee house in Leipzig.

The cantata's libretto (written by Christian Friedrich Henrici, known as Picander), features lines like "If I couldn't, three times a day, be allowed to drink my little cup of coffee, in my anguish I will turn into a shriveled-up roast goat".

Bach wrote no operas: the cantata was written for concert performance, but is frequently performed today fully staged with costumes.

Scoring 

The work is scored for three vocal soloists in the roles
 Narrator, tenor
 Schlendrian (Stick in the Mud), bass
 Lieschen, his daughter, soprano.

The orchestra consists of flauto traverso, two violins obbligato, viola, cembalo and basso continuo.

Movements

Recordings 

 Emma Kirkby, Rogers Covey-Crump, David Thomas, Academy of Ancient Music, Christopher Hogwood. J.S. Bach: Coffee Cantata / Peasant Cantata. L'Oiseau-Lyre, 1987.
 Amsterdam Baroque Orchestra & Choir, Ton Koopman. J.S. Bach: Complete Cantatas Vol. 4. Antoine Marchand, 1996.
 Bach Collegium Japan, Masaaki Suzuki, Makoto Sakurada, Carolyn Sampson, Stephan Schreckenberger. Bach Secular Cantatas BWV 210 and BWV 211. BIS, 2004.

Notes

References

External links 

 Schweigt stille, plaudert nicht, BWV 211: performance by the Netherlands Bach Society (video and background information)
 
 Schweigt stille, plaudert nicht: history, scoring, Bach website 
 BWV 211 Schweigt stille, plaudert nicht: English translation, University of Vermont
 Bach Cantata Translations: German libretto with parallel English translation by Pamela Dellal
 

Secular cantatas by Johann Sebastian Bach
Coffee culture
Music in Leipzig
1735 compositions
Works about coffee